Constitutionalism in the United States is a basic value espoused by political parties, activist groups and individuals across a wide range of the political spectrum, that the powers of federal, state and local governments are limited by the Constitution of the United States and that the civil and political rights of citizens should not be violated.

As a political movement, many constitutionalists have expressed concern over provisions of the 2001 USA Patriot Act, civil asset forfeiture laws, mass surveillance, police checkpoints and militarization of police, while differing over other issues, such as restrictions on firearms, states' rights to determine drug and restroom laws, and federal management of public lands.

See also
Alliance Defending Freedom
American Civil Liberties Union
Center for Constitutional Rights
Constitutional militia movement
Drug Policy Alliance
Electronic Frontier Foundation
National Coalition Against Censorship
National Rifle Association
New York Civil Liberties Union
Rutherford Institute
United States Bill of Rights

References

Civil liberties in the United States
Constitutional law
Political movements in the United States